Charles Isherwood (born 1964/65) is an American theater critic.

Education
Isherwood is a graduate of Stanford University.

Career
Isherwood wrote for Backstage West in Los Angeles. In 1993, he joined the staff of Variety, where he was promoted to the position of chief theatre critic in 1998.

In 2004, Isherwood was hired by The New York Times. He was fired by the paper in 2017, reportedly following public disputes with colleagues and correspondence with theatre producers that "violated ethical rules." In March 2017, Isherwood was hired as a contributor for the website Broadway News.

In 2022, Isherwood was appointed Wall Street Journal theater critic, replacing Terry Teachout.

References 

5. https://www.thestage.co.uk/opinion/wall-street-journal-hire-is-a-win-for-media-theatre-coverage
retrieved 6/11/22

External links
Charles Isherwood at The New York Times
Charles Isherwood at Variety

1960s births
Living people
American theater critics
American male journalists
Critics employed by The New York Times
Stanford University alumni
Variety (magazine) people